Daniel DeVerl "Malano" Seum (born January 28, 1940) is an American politician. He was a member of the Kentucky State Senate from the 38th District, serving from 1995 to 2019. On Nov. 1, 2019, he submitted his resignation. He is a member of the Republican Party.  Seum also served in the Kentucky House of Representatives from 1982 to 1988 and in the Senate from 1989 to 1992.

References

Living people
1940 births
Republican Party Kentucky state senators
Politicians from Louisville, Kentucky
21st-century American politicians
Republican Party members of the Kentucky House of Representatives